Aqasi is an Iranian name. Notable people with the name include:

 Haji Mirza Aqasi ( 1783–1849), Iranian political leader
 Hossein Qollar-Aqasi, Iranian painter

See also 
 Agassi
 Agha (disambiguation)
 Aghasi (name)
 Aghasin (disambiguation)